This is a list of enclosed shopping malls in the New England region of the United States

This is a list of outlet shopping malls in the New England.

 Denotes urban mall

See also
List of largest shopping malls in the United States
List of largest enclosed shopping malls in Canada
List of largest shopping malls in the world

References